David Patrick (1886 – 5 July 1968) was a New Zealand cricketer. He played in twelve first-class matches for Wellington from 1907 to 1922.

See also
 List of Wellington representative cricketers

References

External links
 

1886 births
1968 deaths
New Zealand cricketers
Wellington cricketers
Cricketers from Melbourne